The Pozo de Banfield is a former Buenos Aires Provincial Police station and a former Argentine clandestine detention center that operated between November 1974 and October 1978, during the military dictatorship that ruled the country from 1976 to 1983. This detention center was an integral part of what came to be known as the Circuito Camps and was one of the first to operate as such during the constitutional government of Isabel Perón, nearly 18 months before the 1976 coup d'état. With the nationwide extension of the 1975 annihilation decrees, provincial police forces were placed under command of the Army, and subsequently the Banfield Investigations Brigade became subordinated to the 3rd Mechanized Infantry Regiment of the Argentine Army.

Location and architecture 
The three-story building is located in the intersection of the Siciliano and Vernet streets in Villa Centenario in the city of Banfield in Greater Buenos Aires. The commander's office, a torture room and other facilities were located on the ground floor. On the first floor there were cells, offices, the staff dining room and canteen, kitchens, and restrooms, while on the second floor there were more cells and another restroom.

A total of 309 people, including Uruguayans, Paraguayans and Chileans were detained in the center. Of the detainees, ninety-seven were victims of forced disappearance and five were set free and subsequently killed. Among the prisoners there were four pregnant women who gave birth in the premises and whose children remain unidentified. Housing women during the last months of pregnancy and separating newborns from their mothers is considered to be one of the main functions of Pozo de Banfield.  Most of the students abducted during the Night of the Pencils in September 1976 were detained for three months in the building.

The building was the headquarters of the Banfield Investigations Brigade since the 1960s and continued in this capacity throughout its use as a clandestine detention center. In 2006, it was handed over to the Secretariat of Human Rights at the request of social organisations, in order to build a memory site.

See also 
 National Reorganization Process
 Disappeared during the Process of National Reorganisation
 Terrorism of State in Argentina in the decades of 1970 and 1980

References

External links 

 Clandestine Maternities: Pozo de Banfield, Abuelas de Plaza de Mayo website.

Lomas de Zamora Partido
Law enforcement agencies of Argentina
Dirty War